Baliochila warrengashi is a butterfly in the family Lycaenidae. It is found in the Usambara Mountains of Tanzania.

Adults are on wing in February and March.

Eponym
Baliochila warrengashi is named in honour of Haydon Warren-Gash.

References

Butterflies described in 1996
Poritiinae
Endemic fauna of Tanzania
Butterflies of Africa